Paul Morgan Herbert (December 2, 1889 – July 5, 1983) was an American politician of the Republican Party who served three separate tenures as the 47th, 49th and 52nd lieutenant governor of Ohio. He was born in Marseilles, Ohio.

During the First World War, Herbert served in the United States Army. From 1922 to 1926, he served as a member of the Ohio House of Representatives and then was elected to the Ohio State Senate, where he served from 1926 to 1930.

In 1938, he was elected to the lieutenant governorship for the first time and began his service in 1939. In 1940, he won re-election by defeating challenger Robert S. Cox. He won a third term in 1942 against George D. Nye. His first stint as lieutenant governor ended in 1945.

In 1946, Herbert unseated Nye from the lieutenant governorship, which he had won in 1944. He took office again in 1947. However, he served only one term since he lost to Nye in 1948. Herbert ran again for the office in 1956 and defeated John Taylor. However, he was again limited to one term and was unseated in 1958 by John W. Donahey.

Herbert served as a justice of the Ohio Supreme Court from 1963 to 1969. He died in 1983 in Dublin, Ohio, and is interred at Union Cemetery in Somerset, Ohio.

Herbert was married to Ruby F. Thomas on August 15, 1924. They had two children.

References

External sources
 – photo, was American Legion Post Commander in 1921

1889 births
1983 deaths
Lieutenant Governors of Ohio
Justices of the Ohio Supreme Court
Republican Party members of the Ohio House of Representatives
Republican Party Ohio state senators
University of Michigan Law School alumni
Ohio State University Moritz College of Law alumni
United States Army personnel of World War I
People from Wyandot County, Ohio
20th-century American judges
20th-century American politicians